The Boy Scouts of the Philippines (BSP) is the national scouting organization of the Philippines in the World Organization of the Scout Movement. The Scout movement  was first introduced in the Philippines on 1910 during the American Occupation. It was "granted Recognition as a Member Organisation of the Boy Scouts International Conference...with effect from October 31, 1936" by virtue of certification signed by J. S. Wilson, Olave Baden-Powell, and Daniel Spry.

For most of the late 20th century and into the 21st century, the Boy Scouts of the Philippines is among the largest Scout organizations in the world, currently 4th, in terms of membership count (behind Boy Scouts of America, The Bharat Scouts and Guides of India and the co-ed Gerakan Pramuka Indonesia), largely due to the organization's dependence on the Department of Education.

Program sections
 KID Scouting (Kabataang Iminumulat Diwa) is for boys 4 to 6 years old (in pre-school).  They wear a light blue neckerchief.
 KAB Scouting (Kabataan Alay sa Bayan) is for boys 6 to 9 years old (grades 1 through 3).  They wear a yellow neckerchief.
 Boy Scouting is for boys 9 to 12 years old (grades 4 through 6).  They wear a green neckerchief.
 Senior Scouting is for boys 13 to 19 years old (grades 7 through 12).  They wear a red neckerchief.
 Rover Scouting is for young men 18 to 26 years old (grades 11–12 and college level). Rovers aged 24 and above are called Rover Peers. They wear a navy blue neckerchief.

KAB Scout Advancement Program
 Young
 Growing
 Leaping

Boy Scout Advancement Program
 Membership
 Tenderfoot Scout
 Second Class Scout
 First Class Scout
 Scout Service
 Scout Citizen

Senior Scout Advancement Program
 Membership
 Explorer
 Pathfinder
 Outdoorsman
 Venturer
 Eagle Scout

Rover Advancement Program
 Yellow Quadrant
 Green Quadrant
 Red Quadrant
 Blue Quadrant
 Chief Scout's Nation Builder

All ranks wear the organizational badge, with elements from the Flag of the Philippines (the national flag forms the basis of the trefoil colors) and the green neckerchief below the trefoil, in their uniforms.

Scout ideals

Vision
 Foremost in preparing the youth to become agents of change in communities, guided by the Scout Oath and Law.

Mission
 To help the youth develop values and acquire competencies to become responsible citizens and capable leaders anchored on the Scout Oath and Law.

Scout Oath
On my honor,  I will do my best
 To do my duty to God and my country, the Republic of the Philippines, and to obey the Scout Law.
   To help other people at all times,
   To keep myself physically strong, mentally awake, and morally straight.

Panunumpa ng Scout
Sa ngalan ng aking dangal ay gagawin ko ang buong makakaya
Upang tumupad sa aking tungkulin sa Diyos at sa aking Bayan, ang Republika ng Pilipinas, at sumunod sa Batas ng Scout;
Tumulong sa ibang tao sa lahat ng pagkakataon;
Mapanatiling malakas ang aking katawan, gising ang isipan at marangal ang asal.

Scout Law / Batas ng Scout

Senior Scout Code

Preamble
We, the sovereign Filipino people, imploring the aid of Almighty God, in order to build a just and humane society, and establish a Government that shall embody our ideals and aspirations, promote the common good, conserve and develop our patrimony, and secure to ourselves and our posterity, the blessings of independence and democracy under the rule of law and a regime of truth, justice, freedom, love, equality, and peace, do ordain and promulgate this Constitution.

Laws and rulings
For most of its existence, the Boy Scouts of the Philippines was a private organization.  However, this status has been officially and legally reversed with finality by Philippine Supreme Court decisions in 1991 ("government-controlled corporation"), 2011 ("public corporation or a government instrumentality"), and 2012.

History of Scouting

Just 3 years after the birth of the Scout Movement and just 2 years after the Boy Scouts of America was founded the first Philippine troops were organized by Elwood Stanley Brown, Physical Director of the Manila YMCA, in 1910. In 1912, Elwood Stanley Brown recognized by Baden-Powell as "Chief Scoutmaster." In 1913, troops were organized by Mark Thompson, Antonio Torres, Domingo Ponce, and Francisco Varona. In 1914, the Lorillard Spencer Troop organized in November in Zamboanga City by Sherman L. Kiser, the first troop in the southern island of Mindanao.

In Jan 1922, Scouting started at Silliman Institute under the auspices of its church. They applied for registration to BSA National Headquarters, New York, in 1922, and received their document in January 1923 (some eight or nine months before the creation of the BSA Philippine Islands Council No. 545). On April 19, 1922, a certain Mr. Ong of Calivo, Capiz (now Kalibo, Aklan) organized the Boy Scouts of Calivo which the Governor-General of the Philippines Leonard Wood at that time acknowledged in his letter dated January 2, 1923. In 1923, the Rotary Club established the Boy Scouts of America Philippine Islands Council No. 545 in October as a territorial council covering troops organized nationwide (at first the council was only to cover organized Scouting in the Manila area and environs). In 1931, experimentation was conducted in Sea Scouting and Cub Scouting. In 1933, the Philippines made its first participation in an international Scout event, with the BSA Philippine Islands Council delegation embedded in the BSA contingent to the 4th World Scout Jamboree in Budapest, Hungary. In 1934 Rover Scouting was introduced.

The BSA Shanghai District was placed under the supervision of the BSA Philippine Islands Council No. 545.

Establishment

On October 31, 1936, the Boy Scouts of the Philippines were officially chartered under the Commonwealth of the Philippines Act No. 111.  The founding BSP President and Chief Scout were Josephus Stevenot. In 1937, the BSA Philippine Islands Council No. 545, meeting in October, decided on the handover of its properties and responsibilities to the nascent BSP.

In 1938, the BSP was inaugurated by Pres. Manuel Quezon on January 1, and started functioning.  Exequiél Villacorta was appointed the first "Chief Scout Executive" of the Boy Scouts of the Philippines, in imitation of the BSA office of Chief Scout Executive. The young BSP was caught in the crossfires of the Second World War and scouting activities, which were either abolished or absorbed into the paramilitary styled activities of the current Scout Association of Japan during the Japanese-sponsored Second Republic, only resumed in most of the country by late 1945.

Independence era

In 1947, one year after the restoration of independence, the BSP made its first participation in an international event, with the BSP contingent to the 6th World Scout Jamboree in Moisson, France as a full member organization of the World Organization of the Scout Movement's Asia-Pacific Region (established 1956). In 1953, the first Wood Badge course was conducted at BSP Camp Gre-Zar in Novaliches, Quezon City.

In 1954, the first BSP National Scout Jamboree was held at Rolling Hills, Balarâ, Quezon City. Dr. Mariano Villarama de Los Santos served on the World Scout Committee from 1957 until 1959 as its first Filipino member. In 1959, the 10th World Scout Jamboree was held at the National Scout Reservation, University of the Philippines, Los Baños, at the foot of Mount Makiling, in the province of Laguna.  This was the first World Scout Jamboree outside Europe and Canada.

In 1960, the BSP began to indigenize its Scouting programs. That year the Cub Scout program was revised to replace American symbols (e.g. Bobcat, Bear Cub, Wolf Cub, Lion Cub) with Philippine motifs (e.g. Kawan, Mother Usa, Chief Usa, Young Usa, Lauan, Molave, Narra, Leaping Usa). A year later, the Boy Scout program was revised to replace American symbols (e.g. Eagle) with Philippine motifs (e.g. Maginoo, Jose Rizal).

In 1963, 24 members of the BSP delegation to the 11th World Scout Jamboree in Marathon, Greece, died in a plane crash in the sea off the coast of Mumbai, India.  Streets in the South Triangle District of Quezon City were later named in their memory. In 1968, Boy Scouts, Rovers, and Scouters joined in the search-and-rescue operations for victims of the Ruby Tower collapse in August.  For the services rendered by the Scouts, the BSP organization was awarded by President Ferdinand Marcos with a Presidential Gold Medal the following year.

In 1970, Senior Scouting was officially launched as part of the BSP program.  It has three sections: Air (grey uniform), Land (dark green), and Sea (white). In 1971, Ambassador Antonio C. Delgado was elected Chairman of the World Scout Conference, becoming the first Filipino to hold this position. In 1972, BSP membership hit the one-million mark nationwide.

In 1973, the Golden Jubilee Jamboree and first Asia-Pacific Jamboree was held at the National Scout Reservation, University of the Philippines, Los Baños, Laguna.  The jamboree song, "Kapatirang Paglilingkod," reflected the Bagong Lipunan regime of President Marcos. In 1974–75, the Cub Scout name was Philippinised: the Pilipino alphabet at that time did not include the letter C, so "Cub" was replaced with "Kab."  However, since "kab" was not actually a Pilipino word, it was contrived as an acronym for "Kabataan Alay sa Bayan" and written in all caps. In 1975–86, in compliance with the orders of Pres. Marcos, the Boy Scouts of the Philippines was renamed "Kapatirang Scout ng Pilipinas" (literally meaning Scout Brotherhood of the Philippines).  The Scout age groups were reduced from four to two.  The Scout Oath and Scout Law were revised and a new Scout badge was devised.  President Ferdinand Marcos took the title of Chief Scout, the first Philippine head of state to hold the title.

Modern day scouting 

In 1986, the Golden Jubilee of the Boy Scouts of the Philippines (1936–86) was marked. In the aftermath of the People Power Revolution, the name Kapatirang Scout ng Pilipinas was abandoned and the organization reverted to its original name "Boy Scouts of the Philippines", under its first lady Chief Scout, then President Corazon Aquino. In 1990–91, a program was created for pre-school boys and named KID Scouting.  Since "kid" in English and not Filipino, it was contrived as an acronym for "Kabataang Iminumulat Diwa" and written in all caps. In 1991, the 12th Asia-Pacific Jamboree was held in Philippine Scouting Center, University of the Philippines, Los Baños, Laguna. In 1992, the old BSP badge was reinstated.

In 1993, the Philippines hosted the first ASEAN Scout Jamboree. In 1997, the 2nd World Scout Parliamentary Union held in Manila. In 1999, the first Venture Scout Jamboree was held on Ilian Hills, Iriga City, Camarines Sur, Bicol. In 2007, the BSP observed the world centennial of the Scout Movement. In 2009–10, the BSP hosted the 26th Asia-Pacific Jamboree, 28 December 2009 – 3 January 2010. This was the third APR Jamboree in the Philippines. In 2011,  BSP celebrated 75 years of Philippine Scouting. In 2013, the National Peace Jamboree held on Mount Makiling in Laguna, in Capitol Hills Scout Camp in Cebu, and the BSP's Camp Malagos in Davao.

2014 marked the Centennial (1914–2014) anniversary of the defunct Lorillard Spencer Troop, the first official troop in the islands. A "Centennial Jamboree" was held in three venues: Marikina (Luzon), Cebu City (Visayas), and Zamboanga City (Mindanao).

Noted Personalities

References

External links

 Boy Scouts of the Philippines
 Merit Badge Center, Philippines
 The Scout Center

1936 establishments in the Philippines
Scouting in the Philippines
World Organization of the Scout Movement member organizations
Youth organizations established in 1936